The Mercedes-Benz OM606 is a  inline-six cylinder (R6/I6) double overhead camshaft (DOHC) diesel engine with indirect injection manufactured by Mercedes-Benz between 1993 and 2001. It replaced the single overhead camshaft (SOHC) OM603 engine.

It uses a Bosch electronically controlled inline injection pump (ERE) except in the W124 where it uses a Bosch mechanically governed inline injection pump (Bosch M pump with RSF governor).

It is related to the straight-4 2.0 and 2.2 litre OM604 and the straight-5 2.5 litre OM605 engine families of the same era.

Design 

As per the OM603 the engine has a cast iron block and aluminum cylinder head, the block has 7 main caps, they are held by two bolts per cap. The head is a DOHC design with 4 valves x cylinder and split intake ports. As per the OM603 it has hydraulic bucket type lifters, thus requiring no periodical valve adjustment. A big difference when compared to its turbo predecessors is the intercooler.

It has a double row timing chain that drives the injection pump and the camshafts, the sprocket is on the exhaust camshaft and both cams are connected by a gear drive, while the oil pump is driven by a separate single row chain. Only the .962 engine installed on the W210 E300 TURBODIESEL had a MAF sensor.

The main differences between the naturally aspirated and the turbocharged versions are the cylinder head, injection pump, valves, camshafts, rods, intake and exhaust manifolds and some minor differences like oil feed and return holes for the turbo and different crankcase ventilation system, valve cover and plastic engine cover.

Specifications

See also 

 List of Mercedes-Benz engines

OM606
Diesel engines by model
Straight-six engines